The 2019 London Skolars season is the 25th in the club's history, and seventeenth as a professional rugby league outfit. Competing in Betfred League 1, the third tier of British Rugby League and playing at the New River Stadium, London N22, the team is coached by Jermaine Coleman for the fifth consecutive season.

Year Review

January
Just prior to Christmas the London Skolars announce that Betfred Championship club, Toronto Wolfpack are to invest in the London club as part of a ground-breaking transatlantic deal.

The 2019 Betfred League 1 fixtures, released in November 2018, schedule the London Skolars to travel to West Wales Raiders on the second weekend of the season on 23 February. The first home match will see Jermaine Coleman's team play host to Newcastle Thunder on 2 March in a Round 3 fixture.

On the field London Skolars preparations for the new season begin with a now traditional friendly contest against current Super League champions, Wigan Warriors at the Honourable Artillery Company Grounds on the third Friday of the month. A battling display from Jermaine Coleman's men ensures an absorbing contest and a respectable 6-34 reversal against a team containing a number of first teamers.

The following Friday sees the London Skolars complete their pre-season preparations as they entertain London Broncos at the New River Stadium. A disappointing first half has the home side trailing by 26 points at the break, but a stirring second half performance yields four tries for the North Londoners, courtesy of Harrison Brough, Jordan Williams, Mike Greenhalgh and Neil Thorman, although these prove insufficient as the hosts lose 22-36.

February
The London Skolars announce their Round 6 fixture against Leon Pryce's Workington Town on Saturday 6 April will be played as part of an exciting double-header, which will also see Betfred Championship club, Toronto Wolfpack entertain Sheffield Eagles at the New River Stadium.

The north londoners begin their Betfred League 1 campaign with a hard-fought (28-18) away success against West Wales Raiders. A hat-trick of tries from Wigan Warriors dual-registration centre, Sam Grant inspires Jermaine Coleman’s team to return to the capital with the two competition points despite a plucky performance from the Welsh outfit.

March

Milestones

February

Liam Scott made his London Skolars Betfred League 1 debut in the round 2 away victory at West Wales Raiders.
Richard Wilkinson made his first Betfred League 1 start in a London Skolars shirt as the Londoners secured the two points in the round 2 clash at West Wales Raiders.
Xavier Rice made his London Skolars Betfred League 1 debut in the round 2 away success at West Wales Raiders.
Omari Caro played in his 100th professional game in the round 2 triumph at West Wales Raiders, eleven of them for London Skolars.

March

Tables

Betfred League 1

Fixtures and Results (Skolars Score First)

Pre-season

Betfred League 1

Coral Challenge Cup

Player Appearances

Betfred League 1

Notes

Coral Challenge Cup

Notes

Squad Statistics

 Appearances and Points include (Betfred League 1 and Coral Challenge Cup) as of 26 February 2019.

Notes

Tale of the Tape

Most Points in a Game 
12, Round 2: Sam Grant vs. West Wales Raiders (3 tries)

Most tries in a Game
3, Round 2: Sam Grant vs. West Wales Raiders

Highest score in a winning game
28, Round 2: vs. West Wales Raiders

Lowest score in a winning game
28, Round 2: vs. West Wales Raiders

Greatest winning margin
10, Round 2: vs. West Wales Raiders

Greatest number of games won consecutively
1, Round 2 (London Skolars Round 1 fixture vs. North Wales Crusaders was rearranged for 11 May)

Highest score in a losing game
12, Round 3: vs. Newcastle Thunder

Lowest score in a losing game
12, Round 3: vs. Newcastle Thunder

Greatest losing margin
36, Round 3: vs. Newcastle Thunder

Greatest number of games lost consecutively
1, Round 3

Transfers

In

Out

References

External links
skolarsrl.com

2019 in English rugby league
2019 in rugby league by club
London Skolars seasons
London Skolars season